"Anyone Can Fall in Love" is a song, released in 1986, by EastEnders actress Anita Dobson, who played the character of Angie Watts. The song was released as a single, reaching #4 in the UK Singles Chart.

The song also features on the album The Simon May Collection and the Peggy's Theme EP, both released in 2010.

Single 
The BBC television soap opera EastEnders was first broadcast in February 1985. Don Black was commissioned to add lyrics.

In July 2016, it was revealed that the track was the 12th highest-charting TV theme of all time in the UK.

Covers 
Sophie Ellis-Bextor performed a cover of the song at a Soho House venue in White City in 2018

In popular culture 
The single was parodied by Victoria Wood, as an announcement at the end of an edition of Acorn Antiques, within Wood's TV show Victoria Wood As Seen On TV, stated that a single titled "Anyone Can Break A Vase", sung by Miss Babs, was now on sale.

References

1986 songs
1986 singles
1980s ballads
Songs with lyrics by Don Black (lyricist)
EastEnders music
Pop ballads
Songs with music by Simon May
BBC Records singles